Rajshahi Education Board, also known as Board of Intermediate and Secondary Education, Rajshahi, has a total of 785 colleges for higher secondary education affiliated to it as of 2018. It is responsible for the public schooling in Rajshahi Division of Bangladesh.

Bogra District

Adamdighi

Bogra Sadar

Dhunat

Dhupchanchia

Gabtali

Kahaloo

Nandigram

Shahajanpur

Sariakandi

Sherpur

Shibganj

Sonatola

Chapai Nawabganj District

Bholahat

Gomastapur

Nachole

Capai Nawabganj Sadar

Shibganj

Joypurhat District

Akkelpur

Joypurhat Sadar

Kalai

Khetlal

Panchbibi

Naogaon District

Atrai

Badalgachhi

Dhamoirhat

Mahadebpur

Manda

Naogaon Sadar

Niamatpur

Patnitala

Porsha

Raninagar

Sapahar

Natore District

Bagati Para

Baraigram

Gurudaspur

Lalpur

Naldanga

Natore Sadar

Singra

Pabna District

Atghaira

Bera

Bhangura

Chatmohar

Faridpur

Ishwardi

Pabna Sadar

Santhia

Sujanagar

Rajshahi District

Bagha

Bagmara

Boalia

Charghat

Durgapur

Godagari

Matihar

Mohanpur

Paba

Puthia

Rajpara

Shah Makhdum

Tanore

Sirajganj District

Belkuchi

Chauhali

Kamarkhanda

Kazipur

Royganj

Shahjadpur

Sirajganj Sadar

Tarash

Ullah Para

References

Rajshahi Division